The 2019 Punjab State Super Football League is the 33rd season of the Punjab State Super Football League, the top-tier football league in the Indian state of Punjab. Minerva Punjab FC are the defending champions. The league commenced from 8 August 2019.

Round dates
The 33rd season of the Punjab State Super Football League consist of Phase 1, Phase 2 and Final Phase. 
The schedule will be as follows.

Teams
Phase 1 teams : 
 Doaba Football Club 
 Guru Football Club
 JCT Academy
 Jagat Singh Palahi FA
 Khalsa Warriors FC
 Olympian Jarnail FA
 Principal Harbhajan SC
 SGHS Football Academy
 Sikh Regiment Centre FC
 United FC
 United Punjab FC
 Young Football Club

Final phase teams :
 BSF, Jalandhar
 CRPF, Jalandhar
 Dalbir Football Club
 Kehar Sporting Club
 Minerva Punjab FC
 Punjab Police, Jalandhar

Phase 1

Group A

Group B

Group C

Group D

Phase 2 (qualification round)

Group A

Group B

Final phase

Group A

Group B

Semi-finals

Final

References

Punjab State Super Football League
2019–20 in Indian football leagues